Pleurotomella brenchleyi is a species of sea snail, a marine gastropod mollusk in the family Raphitomidae.

Description
The length of the shell attains 19 mm.

(Original description) The fusiformly turreted shell is moderately solid. It is light brown inclining to ash-colour towards the apex. It contains eight whorls, slightly angulated at the upper part, and somewhat compressed next the sutures, longitudinally more or less prominently ribbed. The oblique ribs (14–15 on the penultimate whorl) are crossed with regular elevated ridges, which are less distinct below the sutures, from which descend very fine and close-set crescent-shaped striae (10–12 on the penultimate whorl) as far as the angle of the whorl, crossing the concentric lines. The spire is sharp. The apex is dark brown or purple. The aperture is elongately ovate, brown within. The outer lip is denticulated at the edge, crenate within, and margined with white. The posterior sinus is broad and shallow. The siphonal canal is short, wide and recurved. The columella is smooth.

The shell is moderately solid, light brown, inclining to ash-color towards the apex. The aperture is tinged with brown.

Distribution
This marine species is endemic to Australia and occurs off New South Wales at depths between 12 mm and 100 m.

References

 Hedley, C. 1903. Scientific results of the trawling expedition of H.M.C.S. Thetis off the coast of New South Wales in February and March, 1898. Mollusca. Part II. Scaphopoda and Gastropoda. Memoirs of the Australian Museum 4(6): 325–402, pls 36–37 
 Allan, J.K. 1950. Australian shells: with related animals living in the sea, in freshwater and on the land. Melbourne : Georgian House xix, 470 pp., 45 pls, 112 text figs. 
 Laseron, C. 1954. Revision of the New South Wales Turridae (Mollusca). Australian Zoological Handbook. Sydney : Royal Zoological Society of New South Wales pp. 56, pls 1–12.

External links
 
  Beechey, D. 2004. Asperdaphne brenchleyi (Angas, 1877)
 Beu, A.G. 2011 Marine Molluscs of oxygen isotope stages of the last 2 million years in New Zealand. Part 4. Gastropoda (Ptenoglossa, Neogastropoda, Heterobranchia). Journal of the Royal Society of New Zealand 41, 1–153
  Hedley, C. 1922. A revision of the Australian Turridae. Records of the Australian Museum 13(6): 213–359, pls 42–56 

brenchleyi
Gastropods described in 1877
Gastropods of Australia